The legal and cultural expectations for date and time representation vary between countries, and it is important to be aware of the forms of all-numeric calendar dates used in a particular country to know what date is intended.

Writers have traditionally written abbreviated dates according to their local custom, creating all-numeric equivalents to day–month formats such as "" (or ) and month–day formats such as "" ( or ). This can result in dates that are impossible to understand correctly without knowing the context. For instance, depending on the order style, the abbreviated date "01/11/06" can be interpreted as "1 November 2006" for DMY, "January 11, 2006" for MDY, and "2001 November 6" for YMD.

The ISO 8601 format YYYY-MM-DD is intended to harmonize these formats and ensure accuracy in all situations. Many countries have adopted it as their sole official date format, though even in these areas writers may adopt abbreviated formats that are no longer recommended.

Usage map

Listing

Table coding 

All examples use example date 2021-03-31 / 2021 March 31 / 31 March 2021 / March 31, 2021 – except where a single-digit day is illustrated.

Basic components of a calendar date for the most common calendar systems:

 D – day
 M – month
 Y – year

Specific formats for the basic components:

 yy – two-digit year, e.g. 21
 yyyy – four-digit year, e.g. 2021
 m – one-digit month for months below 10, e.g. 3
 mm – two-digit month, e.g. 03
 mmm – three-letter abbreviation for month, e.g. Mar
 mmmm – month spelled out in full, e.g. March
 d – one-digit day of the month for days below 10, e.g. 2
 dd – two-digit day of the month, e.g. 02
 ddd – three-letter abbreviation for day of the week, e.g. Fri
 dddd – day of the week spelled out in full, e.g. Friday
Separators of the components:

 / – oblique stroke (slash)
 . – full stop, dot or point (period)
 - – hyphen (dash)
   – space

See also 
 Date and time representation by country
 Common Locale Data Repository, a database that covers national date and time notations
 ISO 8601

References

External links 
 Index of NLS information page Global Development and Computing Portal, published by Microsoft. Links on page lead to individual country date formats.